I manegen med Glenn Killing ("In the ring with Glenn Killing") was a Swedish television show broadcast by SVT in 1992. It marked the television debut of Swedish comedy group Killinggänget.

The show's basic formula is (according to Killinggänget) borrowed from Vic Reeves Big Night Out, with some sketches stolen almost verbatim, but mostly different content and a set of original characters including Percy Nilegård.

Sveriges Television comedy shows